Super Rugby Trans-Tasman (known as Harvey Norman Super Rugby Trans-Tasman in Australia and Sky Super Rugby Trans-Tasman in New Zealand) was a professional men's rugby union club competition in Australia and New Zealand. It featured the five Super Rugby AU teams playing the five Super Rugby Aotearoa teams, followed by a final, and ran from 14 May to 19 June 2021.

Announced on 13 November, the competition followed the 2021 Super Rugby AU season and the 2021 Super Rugby Aotearoa season, with the fixtures being confirmed on 14 December. Each team hosted two home games, while the third round was expected to be a 'Super Round', with all the games being played at a single venue. Ahead of the start of the competition, the Super Round was cancelled due to COVID-19 restrictions, with the matches held at separate venues, although they were still classified as 'neutral venues'. Full venues for Round 3 were announced on 23 April 2021.

Law variations 

Super Rugby Trans-Tasman saw the same law variations that were used in the 2021 Super Rugby AU season used in the competition. Goal-line dropouts and the ability to replace a red carded player after 20 minutes were carried over to this competition as were used in both Super Rugby AU and the 2021 Super Rugby Aotearoa season. The captain's referral and Golden Point extra time used in the 2021 Super Rugby Aotearoa season though were not used in Super Rugby Trans-Tasman, while the 50/22 kicking law, restart variation and Golden Try extra time used in the 2021 Super Rugby AU season were also not used in the competition.

Standings

Round-by-round
The table below shows the progression of all teams throughout Super Rugby Trans-Tasman. Each team's tournament points on the standings log is shown for each round, with the overall log position in brackets.

Matches

Round 1

Round 2

Round 3

Round 4

Round 5

Final

Notes

Statistics

Leading point scorers

Source: Points

Leading try scorers

Source: Tries

Discipline

Squads 

The following squads have been named. Players listed in italics denote non-original squad members.

Referees
The following referees were selected to officiate Super Rugby Trans-Tasman:

Media coverage

Television 
In Australia, all games were broadcast live on streaming service Stan Sport, with a select game each round simulcast live free-to-air on the Nine Network. Sky Sport aired the competition in New Zealand.

Overseas, the following broadcasters showed Super Rugby Trans-Tasman:

See also 

 Super Rugby
 Super Rugby AU
 Super Rugby Aotearoa
 Super Rugby Unlocked

References

External links 

 

 
 
 
 
Rugby union competitions for provincial teams
2021 Super Rugby season
2021 in Australian rugby union
2021 in New Zealand rugby union
2021 rugby union tournaments for clubs
Professional sports leagues in Australia
Professional sports leagues in New Zealand
Multi-national professional rugby union leagues
Multi-national professional sports leagues